The National Museum of Contemporary Art (EMST Εθνικό Μουσείο Σύγχρονης Τέχνης (ΕΜΣΤ)), established in October 2000, is the sole national institution focused only on collecting and exhibiting contemporary Greek and international art in Athens. Anna Kafetsi, Ph.D. in Aesthetics- Art History and former curator for 17 years of the 20th century collection at the National Gallery of Athens, was appointed founding director of EMST.

History
EMST first operated, from 2000 to September 2003, on the ground floor of approximately 1,800 square meters, of the old Fix brewery, an example of post-war industrial architecture designed by Takis Zenetos. It is located in close proximity to the center of Athens as well as the archaeological sites of the city, including the Acropolis and the Acropolis Museum. As of 2020, the restoration of the building is in progress in order to create state-of-the-art facilities for the permanent collection, periodic exhibitions, educational programs, and workshops. After an international architectural competition was announced, the architectural office which won the first prize and will realize the renovation of the Fix building are 3SK Stylianidis Architects in collaboration with Ioannis Mouzakis and associates architects LTD – studies of technical works Pan. Babilis and associates, and INSTA.

Until the return of the museum to the Fix building, EMST will continue its exhibitions program in the spaces of the Athens Conservatory, one of the most prestigious cultural institutions and finest buildings of architecture in the capital. By 2020, the Greek government spent 40 million euros on the museum, with the Stavros Niarchos Foundation giving a further 3 million euros in the final push towards completion. In the meantime, the delays in the museum's opening cost EMST a 3.3 million dollars subsidy from the European Union. Ownership of the Fix building was transferred from the subway authority Attica Metro, which owned the former brewery since the 1990s, to the museum foundation.

Directors 
 Anna Kafetsi (2000-2014), Founding Director
 Katerina Koskina (2014-2018)
 Dimitris Antonakakis & Syrago Tsiara (2019-2021) Interim Directors
 Katerina Gregos (2021-present)

Collections
Pivotal aspect of the EMST's artistic policy is the enhancement and enrichment of its permanent collections with works from Greek and international artists. There are two main axons according to which the collections are structured: a historic one, dating from the second half of the 20th century, and a contemporary one.

The museum is developing its permanent collections through purchasing works of art as well as soliciting donations. EMST aims at developing, within the next few years, a core collection of works representative of the basic directions of contemporary art.

Among the most important acquisitions are works by Ilya Kabakov, Stephen Antonakos, Gary Hill, Nan Goldin, Vadim Zakharov, Gillian Wearing, Ann Sofi Siden, Vlassis Caniaris, Nikos Kessanlis, Eleni Mylonas, Dimitris Alithinos, Nikos Navridis, Joel Sanders, Allan Sekula, Costas Tsoclis, George Hadjimichalis, Chryssa, Yiannis Psychopedis, Andreas Angelidakis, Lewis.Tsurumaki.Lewis and Tessera.

A rich collection of video art has also been built. Among the most prominent artists are: Bill Viola, Bruce Nauman, Nam June Paik,  Mona Hatoum, Vito Acconci, Dan Graham,  Robert Wilson, Tony Oursler, Marina Abramović & Ulay, Eleni Mylonas, Chris Burden, Lynda Benglis,  Sadie Benning, Sophie Calle & Gregory Shephard, Carolee Schneemann, Martha Rosler, Dara Birnbaum, Walid Ra’ad/The Atlas Group and Jayce Salloum.

In 2022, EMST received a major donation of 140 contemporary art pieces through the D.Daskalopoulos Collection Gift, including major works by artists Kutluğ Ataman, Abraham Cruzvillegas, Paul McCarthy, Ana Mendieta, Annette Messager as well as many Greek artists as well.

Exhibitions
Within the framework of the exhibition policy of EMST, series of periodical exhibitions of open and explorative character are presented, on issues, investigations, and quests of international contemporary art, individual works commissioned by the Museum, mid-career retrospectives of contemporary artists, and historical retrospectives on the fields of painting, installations, photography, video, new media, and "experimental" architecture. Until the Museum building will have been completed and will be able to open its doors to the public, the permanent collections (both historical and contemporary) are presented in periodical exhibitions with selections of thematic and conceptual nuclei or artistic tendencies.

Educational Programs
Within the framework of the educational policy of EMST educational programs for school groups and families, children workshops, tours for adults, and educators' seminars are realized, aiming at contributing to the discovery of and familiarization with contemporary art, Greek and international, of all age audiences.

Research
Aside from the permanent collection, periodic exhibitions and educational programming, the museum directs its efforts toward establishing an important infrastructure for research and artistic creation in its premises. Within this framework, the National Museum of Contemporary Art will establish and organize a center for the production of audiovisual works of art as well as a center of digital documentation of contemporary art. Both centers will be developed with the support of the Ministry of Culture and the funding programs “Culture” and “Information Society” of the European Union.

Publications
The EMST editorial program includes bilingual (in Greek and English) exhibition catalogs, which host theoretical and critical essays, as well as interdisciplinary interpretational approaches bu sociologists, anthropologists, philosophers, e.a. Special educational booklets for Primary and Secondary ( High School and Lyceum) education, as well as editions with the Museum new Acquisitions. A series of editions of Critical Essays on contemporary art, as well as artists' monographs based on unpublished material of The Archives of Greek Artists is being prepared.

Library and Archives
The Library of EMST includes a significant number of specialized editions and journals on the fields of History and Theory of Art, Museology and Conservation of art works as well as on the field of History of Philosophy, Anthropology, Architecture and Industrial Design, New Technologies and Multimedia and is constantly enriched in order to serve scientific research and writing as well as the induction of the staff, of the visitors/researchers and artists. Also, a project for the exchange of editions with institutions in Greece and abroad has already been initiated.

Greek artists and galleries have granted to the museum archives related to contemporary Greek art, after an invitation by EMST. The archives are constituted by catalogues, books, exhibition invitations, audiovisual material, texts by artists, correspondence, critiques, reviews, reproductions of works and biographical data.

The donation of the archives of Bia Davou and Pandelis Xagoraris by their son Zafos Xagoraris is exceptionally significant. It contains more than 2.000 articles and manuscripts of the two artists, their correspondence between them and also with other fellow artists, correspondence with official Fine Arts institutions, such as the Chamber of Fine Arts and the Ministry of Culture, archival material of the DESMOS gallery, which played a leading role in the artistic scene of the '70s, archival material from the Association of Contemporary Art and Artists and more.

See also
 List of national galleries
 National Gallery (Athens)
 Municipal Gallery of Athens
 Benaki Museum, Athens
 State Museum of Contemporary Art, Thessaloniki

References

External links 

EMST website
EMST blog
City of Athens
www.athensinfoguide.com

Museums in Athens
Modern art museums in Greece
Art museums established in 2000
2000 establishments in Greece